Antoni Rewera (1869–1942) was a priest and dean of the Cathedral Chapter in Sandomierz. He was imprisoned in the Nazi concentration camp at Auschwitz. He was tortured to death on 1 October 1942 at the Dachau concentration camp, Bavaria, Germany.

He is included by the Catholic Church in the 108 Martyrs of World War II from Poland.

See also 
List of Nazi-German concentration camps
The Holocaust in Poland
World War II casualties of Poland

References

1869 births
1942 deaths
Founders of Catholic religious communities
People from Sandomierz
Auschwitz concentration camp prisoners
Polish people who died in Nazi concentration camps
Polish people who died in Dachau concentration camp